Ponta da Fragata (Portuguese meaning "tip of the frigate") is a headland on the east coast of the island of Sal, Cape Verde. It is situated at the southern end of the Serra Negra mountain, 6 km northeast of the town Santa Maria. To the south of the headland stretches the Costa da Fragata, a 4.7 km long sandy beach which is a protected nature reserve, important as nesting area for loggerhead sea turtles.

See also
List of protected areas in Cape Verde
Tourism in Cape Verde

References

Headlands of Cape Verde
Beaches of Cape Verde
Santa Maria, Cape Verde
Geography of Sal, Cape Verde